Gogangra laevis is a species of sisorid catfish found in Bangladesh where it occurs in the Jamuna and Meghna River drainages. This species grows to a length of  SL.

References 

Sisoridae
Fish described in 2005
Fish of Bangladesh
Catfish of Asia